g Aquarii can refer to two different astronomical objects:

 g1 Aquarii or 66 Aquarii, commonly called simply g Aquarii
 g2 Aquarii or 68 Aquarii

References

Aquarius (constellation)
Aquarii, g